Nicolás Víctor Herrera  (born 27 July 1983 in La Rioja) is an Argentine football forward. He currently plays for Andino Sport Club.

Career
Herrera started his playing career in 2002 for Racing Club de Avellaneda. In 2005, he joined Gimnasia de Jujuy. In 2006 Herrera moved down a division to join San Martín de San Juan, but in 2007 the club secured promotion to the Argentine Primera División.

After a spell with Estudiantes La Rioja, Herrera returned to Andino SC in January 2020.

References

External links
 Nicolás Herrera at BDFA
 Football-Lineups player profile
 
 

1983 births
Living people
Sportspeople from La Rioja Province, Argentina
Argentine footballers
Association football midfielders
Gimnasia y Esgrima de Jujuy footballers
San Martín de San Juan footballers
San Martín de Tucumán footballers
Argentine Primera División players
Primera Nacional players
Torneo Argentino A players
Torneo Argentino B players